The 1994 South American Cross Country Championships took place on January 12–13, 1994.  The races were held Manaus, Brazil.

Complete results, results for junior and youth competitions, and medal winners were published.

Medallists

Race results

Senior men's race (12.1 km)

Note: Athletes in parentheses did not score for the team result.  (n/s: nonscorer)

Junior (U20) men's race (7.3 km)

Note: Athletes in parentheses did not score for the team result.  (n/s: nonscorer)

Youth (U17) men's race (3.7 km)

Note: Athletes in parentheses did not score for the team result.  (n/s: nonscorer)

Senior women's race (6.1 km)

Note: Athletes in parentheses did not score for the team result.  (n/s: nonscorer)

Junior (U20) women's race (3.7 km)

Note: Athletes in parentheses did not score for the team result.  (n/s: nonscorer)

Youth (U17) women's race (2.5 km)

Note: Athletes in parentheses did not score for the team result.  (n/s: nonscorer)

Medal table (unofficial)

Note: Totals include both individual and team medals, with medals in the team competition counting as one medal.

Participation
According to an unofficial count, 81 athletes (+ 1 guest athlete) from 6 countries (1 + guest country) participated.

 (21)
 (1)
 (49)
 (2)
 (7)
 Perú (1)

Guest country:
 (1)

See also
 1994 in athletics (track and field)

References

External links
 GBRathletics

South American Cross Country Championships
South American Cross Country Championships
South American Cross Country Championships
South American Cross Country Championships
International athletics competitions hosted by Brazil
Cross country running in Brazil
January 1994 sports events in South America